The 1956 Tulsa Golden Hurricane football team represented the University of Tulsa during the 1956 NCAA University Division football season. In their second year under head coach Bobby Dodds, the Golden Hurricane compiled a 7–2–1 record (2–1–1 against Missouri Valley Conference opponents), finished in second place in the conference, and ranked seventh of 111 teams in scoring defense with an average of 6.7 points allowed per game.

The team's statistical leaders included George Cagliola with 394 passing yards, Dick Hughes with 618 rushing yards, and Ronnie Morris with 150 receiving yards.

Schedule

References

Tulsa
Tulsa Golden Hurricane football seasons
Tulsa Golden Hurricane football